Sweet Mama  is a 1930 American pre-Code talkie comedy drama film with songs, which was directed by Edward F. Cline and produced and distributed by First National Pictures. The film stars Alice White, David Manners, Kenneth Thomson and Rita Flynn. Planned as a full-scale musical, and released as such for a short time in the summer of 1930, most of the songs were cut from general release prints by the autumn of 1930 due to the public's aversion for musicals.

Plot
When the film begins we find Alice White stranded several hundred miles away from New York with a burlesque troupe. She receives a telegraph that her boyfriend, played by David Manners, is in jail. White boards a train headed for New York without a ticket because she has no money. When the conductor discovers she has no ticket she is almost thrown off the train. A detective, played by Robert Elliott, befriends White and offers to let White borrow the money she needs for a ticket. When she arrives in New York she finds that Manners has been bailed out by a friend and is working for Kenneth Thomson, playing as a gangster who runs a nightclub. White is disappointed to find that her boyfriend is working for criminals. She gets some money from Manners to pay back Elliott for the money he gave her for a train ticket. Elliott notices that she is paying with bills that have been reported stolen. White confesses everything she knows to the detective about her boyfriend and his new employer. Elliott asks White to get a job at the nightclub so that she can get evidence against the gangsters and in return he promises to clear her boyfriend of any wrongdoing. White easily gets a job singing and dancing at the club. Eventually she hears plans about a bank robbery and reports everything to Elliott. When the gangster attempt to rob the bank they realize that the police are watching and waiting and conclude that someone has informed the police ahead of time. Thompson suspects that White has informed the police. In order to save her, Manners implicates himself and the gangsters get ready to stage an accidental suicide for him. They plan to throw Manners out of the window of Thompson's penthouse apartment. White informs the police and arrives in the nick of time to save Manners. Thompson, realizing now that the police have ample evidence against him, attempts to escape and is shot by the police. Manners and White are happily reunited and the film ends.

Cast
Alice White as Goldie
David Manners as Jimmy
Kenneth Thomson as Joe Palmer
Rita Flynn as Lulu
Lee Moran as Al Hadrick
Richard Cramer as Elmer
Robert Elliott as Mack
Lew Harvey as Gangster
Lee Shumway as Gangster

Songs
"Giving It This and That" Sung by Alice White (written by Archie Gottler and George W. Meyer)

Release
Due to the public's backlash against musicals late in 1930, most of the musical numbers were cut from the film to make it more marketable, which accounts for the very short running time of the film, 54 minutes. The film was advertised as a gangster picture, a genre which had become very popular with the public. The complete film, with all the music intact, was released intact in countries outside the United States where a backlash against musicals never occurred.

Preservation status
The status of the full 77-minute version of the film is unknown, but a 54-minute version of the film, with most of the musical numbers edited out, does exist.

References

External links

1930 films
First National Pictures films
Films directed by Edward F. Cline
American black-and-white films
American comedy-drama films
1930 comedy-drama films
1930s English-language films
1930s American films